Oreophryne insulana is a species of frog in the family Microhylidae.
It is endemic to Papua New Guinea.
Its natural habitat is subtropical or tropical wet/damp environments  montane forests.

References

insulana
Amphibians of Papua New Guinea
Taxonomy articles created by Polbot
Amphibians described in 1956